MSSD may refer to:
Model Secondary School for the Deaf
Malvern Special School District